Park Taewon (Hangul: 박태원 December 7, 1909July 10, 1986) was a modern South Korean writer who moved to North Korea.

Life
Park Taewon was born in Seoul, Korea on December 7, 1909. Park Taewon's pennames include Mongbo and Gubo. Park graduated from Gyeongseong Jeil High School, and entered Hosei University, Japan in 1930 but did not earn a degree. As a high school student, Park debuted as a poet when his poem “Elder Sister” (Nunim) won honorable mention in a contest sponsored by the journal Joseon Literary World (Joseon mundan); and as a fiction writer in 1929 with the publication of his short story “The Beard” (Suyeom) in New Life (Sinsaeng). Park joined the Group of Nine (Guinhoe, a group that also included Yi Sang) in 1930 and devoted himself to fiction thereafter. Upon Liberation in 1945 he became a member of the Central Executive Committee of the Korean Writers’ Alliance (Joseon munhakga dongmaeng).

In 1950, Park crossed the 38th Parallel into North Korea where he wrote and worked as a professor at Pyeongyang Literature University. He was purged and prohibited from writing in 1956, but his writing privileges were reinstated in 1960.

Park died on July 10, 1986 in North Korea. His grandson, through a daughter he left in South Korea, is the movie director Bong Joon-ho.

Work
The Korea Literature Translation Institute describes Park's contributions to Korean modern literature:

A modernist writer who boldly embraced experimental techniques and meticulous craftsmanship, Park Taewon was primarily concerned with the aestheticism and the mode of expression itself rather than the ideas expressed. His early fictional works, in particular, were a product of his attempt to engineer a new writing style: “Exhaustion” (Piro, 1933) and “Forlorn People” (Ttakhan saramdeul, 1934) contain symbols and diagrams from newspaper advertisement; “Circumstances” (Jeonmal, 1935) and “Biryang” (Biryang, 1936), contain long phrases composed of over five sentences stringed together with commas. 

Park, along with Lee Sang, rejected tendency literature, and stressed the importance of appreciating literature as a linguistic art, not as a medium for conveying ideologies. In the latter half of 1930s, however, he came to focus increasingly on the customs and mannerisms of the time, and eventually abandoned his interest in stylistic invention. A Day in the Life of Novelist Gubo (Soseolga Gubossiui 1 il), serialized in Chosun joongang Ilbo from August 1 to September 19, 1934, is a semi-autobiographical novel depicting a series of observations made by a writer taking a walk around the city. Scenes by a Stream (Cheonbyeon punggyeong, 1936-1937), an elaborate portrait of urban manners and working class life presented episodically, is often regarded as the representative modernist novel of the 1930s. After Korea regained independence, Park turned to historical issues and problems of national identity, and began to write historical novels almost exclusively.

Works in Translation
 A Day in the Life of Kubo the Novelist in On the Eve of the Revolution and Other Stories from Colonial Korea
  Scenes from Ch'onggye Stream

Works in Korean (Partial)
Novels
 Does the Day of Enlightenment Break Over Hills and Streams? (Gyemyeong sancheoneun balga oneunya, 1965)
 Gabo Peasant War (Gabo nongmin jeonjaeng, 1977-1986)
Short Stories
 "Exhaustion (Piro, 1933)
 Forlorn People (Ttakhan saramdeul, 1934)
 Circumstances (Jeonmal, 1935)
 Biryang (Biryang, 1936)
 A Day in the Life of Novelist Gubo (Soseolga Gubossiui 1 il),
 Scenes by a Stream (Cheonbyeon punggyeong, 1936-1937)

References 

1909 births
1986 deaths
20th-century North Korean writers
20th-century South Korean writers
Korean male writers
People from Seoul
South Korean emigrants to North Korea